Quartz is a common mineral.

Quartz may also refer to:

Places
Quartz, California, former settlement in Butte County
Quartz Hill, California, an unincorporated community in Los Angeles County

People
Jakie Quartz, French singer

Arts, entertainment, and media

Music
Quartz (duo), dance music production team
Quartz (British band), Heavy Metal band
Qwartz Electronic Music Awards

Other arts, entertainment, and media
Quartz (publication), a privately held global business news website
Rose Quartz, animated television series character, see list of Steven Universe characters

Computing
Quartz (graphics layer), the graphics-rendering technology used in Mac OS X
Quartz (scheduler), a Java Enterprise Job Scheduler
 Microsoft DirectShow, code name Quartz
 Microsoft Expression Web, code name Quartz
Quartz 2D, an API on Mac OS X
Quartz Compositor, the display server on Mac OS X

Technology
Quartz (electronics), an electronic component
 Engineered quartz, a synthetic material used for countertops and the like, called "quartz" in the trade
Quartz clock, a clock or watch using an oscillator regulated by a quartz crystal